Randy Schneider (born 27 August 2001) is a Swiss professional midfielder who plays for Swiss Super League club St. Gallen.

Career

Youth
Schneider began his career in Switzerland with the youth teams of Beringen, Schaffhausen and Grasshoppers.

Grasshoppers

U21 team
In July 2019, Schneider was promoted to the U21 team of Grasshoppers.

Senior team
In July 2020, Schneider made his debut for the senior team of Grasshoppers in a 4-0 home win against Stade Lausanne. Schneider scored his first professional goal in a 2-1 home win against Chiasso

Loan to Aarau
In September 2020, Schneider was sent out on loan to fellow Swiss Challenge League club Aarau. Schneider made his debut for Aarau in a 1-3 home defeat against Wil, coming in as a substitute for Elsad Zverotić in the 67th minute.

Aarau
After a season-long loan spell at the club, Schneider joined Aarau on a free transfer, signing a two-year deal.

In March 2022, Schneider was named Swiss Football League Player of the Month for the month of February 2022, prevailing against Yanick Brecher of Zürich, Kwadwo Duah of St. Gallen, Asumah Abubakar of Luzern and Jordan Siebatcheu of Young Boys.

St. Gallen
In June 2022, after his 2-season stint with Aarau, Schneider joined Swiss Super League club St. Gallen for an undisclosed fee. He signed a three-year deal with the club.

International career
Born to a Swiss father and a Filipina mother, Schneider is eligible to represent both Switzerland and Philippines at international level. In 2020, it was reported that Schneider was contacted by Scott Cooper, the head coach of Philippines national team regarding playing for the Philippines.

Switzerland youth
Schneider has represented Switzerland at under-16 to under-20 levels.

Honours

Individual
Swiss Football League Player of the Month: February 2022

References

External links

2001 births
People from Schaffhausen
Sportspeople from the canton of Schaffhausen
Living people
Swiss people of Filipino descent
Association football midfielders
Swiss men's footballers
Switzerland youth international footballers
Grasshopper Club Zürich players
FC Aarau players
FC St. Gallen players
Swiss Challenge League players
Swiss Super League players